The 1991 Great American Bash was the third annual Great American Bash professional wrestling pay-per-view event produced by World Championship Wrestling (WCW), and the seventh annual Great American Bash event overall. It was also the first held by WCW alone following its split from the National Wrestling Alliance (NWA) in January 1991. The event took place on July 14, 1991, at the Baltimore Arena in Baltimore, Maryland. This was the fourth Great American Bash held at this venue after the 1988, 1989, and 1990 events.

The original scheduled card of the event was heavily changed. Ric Flair was scheduled to defend the WCW World Heavyweight Championship against Lex Luger in a steel cage match, but Flair quit WCW before the event and was replaced by Barry Windham, with the match being for the vacant championship. Luger defeated Windham to win his first world championship. The final bout of the show was a handicap steel cage match, in which Rick Steiner defeated Arn Anderson and Paul E. Dangerously.

Production

Background
The Great American Bash is a professional wrestling event established in 1985. It was first produced by the National Wrestling Alliance's (NWA) Jim Crockett Promotions (JCP) and aired on closed-circuit television before becoming a pay-per-view event in 1988; JCP was rebranded as World Championship Wrestling (WCW) later that same year. The 1991 event was the third annual Great American Bash event promoted by WCW and seventh annual overall. The event took place on July 14, 1991, at the Baltimore Arena in Baltimore, Maryland. This was the fourth Great American Bash held at this venue after the 1988, 1989, and 1990 events. It was also the first Great American Bash held by WCW alone after its split from the NWA earlier that year in January.

Storylines
The card was originally to be headlined by a steel cage match between Ric Flair and Lex Luger for the WCW World Heavyweight Championship, and this match was heavily promoted on WCW television but two weeks before the show, then-WCW Executive Vice President Jim Herd fired Flair over a contract dispute, stripping him of the title in the process. At the time, champions left a $25,000 security deposit that would be refunded to them (along with any accumulated interest on the deposit) once they lost the title. As Herd did not give Flair back his deposit, he retained possession of the belt and later brought it to the World Wrestling Federation, where he appeared with it on television. WCW had to commission a new world championship belt. However, the new belt could not be readied in time for the event, so the company was forced to improvise. A Championship Wrestling from Florida title belt that was in the possession of Dusty Rhodes was used and a metal plate with "WCW World Heavyweight Champion" was attached to the front.

Event

In the match, Lex Luger pinned Barry Windham, who replaced Flair, after a piledriver on orders from Harley Race. After the match, Luger turned heel and took on Race as his manager and Mr. Hughes as his bodyguard.

P. N. News and Bobby Eaton were scheduled to face Steve Austin and Terrance Taylor in a traditional scaffold match but on the day of the show, a "capture the flag" stipulation was added as the wrestlers were unwilling to perform a risky fall from the scaffold.

Dustin Rhodes and The Young Pistols (Tracy Smothers and Steve Armstrong) faced The Fabulous Freebirds is a six-man elimination match.

The masked The Yellow Dog defeated Johnny B. Badd by disqualification when Badd's manager Teddy Long interfered to try to unmask Yellow Dog; had he done so, Brian Pillman (who was wrestling under the mask) would not be allowed to wrestle in WCW again.

The final match was originally supposed to pit The Steiner Brothers and Missy Hyatt against Arn Anderson, Barry Windham and Paul E. Dangerously. After Windham was moved to the title match following Flair's departure from WCW and Scott Steiner sustained an injury, the match was changed into a mixed tag team match pitting Rick Steiner and Missy Hyatt against Arn Anderson and Paul E. Dangerously. Before the match Dick Murdoch and Dick Slater forcibly took Hyatt backstage, turning the match into a handicap match, which Rick Steiner won (in reality, this was done, because the Maryland State Athletic Commission didn't allow intergender matches).

Results

Dustin Rhodes and Young Pistols vs. Fabulous Freebirds eliminations

References

1991
1991 in Maryland
Events in Baltimore
Professional wrestling in Baltimore
July 1991 events in the United States
1991 World Championship Wrestling pay-per-view events